Iron forms two stable oxalates:

 Ferrous oxalate, Fe(C2O4)
 Ferric oxalate, Fe2(C2O4)3